is a railway station in the city of Morioka in Iwate Prefecture, Japan. It is operated by the East Japan Railway Company (JR East). The station was opened on 18 March 2023.

History
 2020
 January 16：Morioka city submits a petition to JR East to establish a station.
 August：Morioka City and JR East conclude a basic agreement on the establishment of a station.
 October：Morioka City and JR East sign a station design agreement.
 2021
 February 25：Morioka City and AEON MALL conclude an agreement regarding the development of this station.
 August：The design of the station is completed.
 December：Construction of the station starts.
 2022
 January 27：The name for the station is decided.
 April 27：A ceremony to pray for safety is held.
 2023
 March 18：Opening.
 May 27：IC card Suica will be available (planned).

Station structure 
It is an above-ground station with a 85 meter long single platform for 4-car trains. (only a shed for 2-car trains of approximately 40 meters)The station itself is a one-story steel frame building with a waiting room of about 15 Square meters.

Located on the north side of AEON MALL Morioka, in front of the station, there is a station square and rotary maintained by Morioka City, a boarding and alighting station for people with physical disabilities, a parking lot for about 100 bicycles, parking for 5 motorcycles, toilets, etc.The station does not have a parking lot, but it does have a drop-off area and a waiting area for one taxi is provided.

It is a petition station by Morioka City, and the total project cost of about 1.1 billion yen is basically borne by the city, including grants from the government and donations from AEON MALL side of 200 million yen.

There are no automatic ticket vending machines or boarding tickets.

Usage situation 
According to Morioka City, the station is expected to have ‘‘1,700 passengers’’ per day.

Station area 
 AEON MALL Morioka
 Sunday (Home Center) Morioka Maegata Store
 K's Denki Morioka Nishi
 Yellow Hat Morioka Inter Store
 Tohoku Expressway Morioka Interchange
 Morioka West Bypass

References

External links

Stations of East Japan Railway Company
Railway stations in Iwate Prefecture
Railway stations in Japan opened in 2023